Minas Tênis Clube, commonly known simply as Minas or the Minas Storm, is a Brazilian basketball club based in Belo Horizonte. It is part of the Minas Tênis Clube multi-sports club. The team plays in the Novo Basquete Brasil (NBB) under the sponsorship name Decisão Engenharia/Minas. It also plays in the BCL Americas as of the 2021–22 season.

The team has won one continental title, by winning the South American Champions Cup in 2007.

History 
Minas was one of the top teams in the first years of Novo Basquete Brasil, reaching the semifinal series two straight years. In both semifinals, the team, led by the center Murilo Becker and the point guard Facundo Sucatzky, was defeated by Brasília. In the 2009–10 NBB season, Minas showed the point guard Raul Togni Neto, better known as Raulzinho. Neto was chosen the NBB Revelation Player and then moved to the Spanish team Lagun Aro. In the 2011–12 NBB season, Minas made a very bad campaign, finishing in thirteenth place and getting out of the playoffs. For the following season the managers made a great renovation of the cast, hiring young players.

Titles and honors
 Copa Super 8 (1): 2021–22
 Campeonato Sudamericano de Clubes (1): 2007
 Amsterdam International Tournament (1): 2007
 Campeonato Metropolitano (5): 1985, 1986, 1988, 1991, 1994
 Campeonato Interestadual (1): 1986
 Torneio Internacional Mercosul (1): 1993
 Torneio José Bento (1): 1993

Players

Current roster

Notable players
  Leandrinho Barbosa
  Murilo Becker
  Bruno Carneiro
  Raulzinho Neto
  Milton Setrini
  Facundo Sucatzky
  Jermaine Beal

Players at the NBA draft

Head coaches

  Che García

References

Basketball teams in Brazil
Basketball teams established in 1937
Sport in Belo Horizonte